A Page (stylized in sentence case) is the debut single album released by Song Yuqi. The album was released digitally on May 13, 2021, by Cube Entertainment. The album consists of two lead singles, "Giant" and "Bonnie and Clyde".

Background and release
On May 6, 2021, Cube Entertainment unveiled the artwork teaser of Yuqi's first single album A Page through the official SNS channel of (G)I-dle. A highlight medley a track in the album was released on May 11. An accompanying animated music video for  "Giant" was uploaded on (G)I-dle's official YouTube channel. The video illustrated a girl running hurriedly as if being chased by something to a forest, and the silhouette of a falling girl continued. At the end of the video, the girl holding the hand mirror that fell on the floor opened the closed door, and soon a bright light poured into the dark room.

On May 19, 2021, Cube Entertainment released the music video teaser for "Bonnie and Clyde". In the teaser released, Yuqi in a black suit is seen looking at herself in the mirror. Scenes such as timers, chessboards, and boiling pots quickly intersect. Then, she makes a hand-shooting gesture toward herself in the mirror. At the end of the video, shots were fired from her hand-shooting gesture, shattering the mirror. A blonde haired woman is dimly seen at the end of the video. The following day, Cube Entertainment released the second music video teaser for "Bonnie and Clyde". In it, Yuqi is behind the wheel of a car. The music video for "Bonnie and Clyde" was released on May 21, 2021.

The album was released on May 13, 2021.

Composition

Music and lyrics
The album contains two singles. The song is written and composed by Song Yuqi, BoyToy, Young Sky, Peter Hyun and ChaTone.

Promotion
Almost a year of the album release , Yuqi performed the band version of the two songs on one music program on MBC M's Show Champion on May 11, 2022.

Track listing

Release history

References

External links

2021 singles
2021 songs
Cube Entertainment singles
Republic Records singles
Albums produced by Song Yuqi
Single albums